Pareuplexia is a genus of moths of the family Noctuidae.

Species
 Pareuplexia chalybeata (Moore, 1867)
 Pareuplexia dissimulans (Warren, 1911)
 Pareuplexia erythriris (Hampson, 1908)
 Pareuplexia flammifera (Warren, 1911)
 Pareuplexia harfordi (Hampson, 1894)
 Pareuplexia humilis (Warren, 1911)
 Pareuplexia luteistigma (Warren, 1913)
 Pareuplexia metallica (Walker, 1865)
 Pareuplexia nigritula (Warren, 1911)
 Pareuplexia nitida (Warren, 1911)
 Pareuplexia pallidimargo (Warren, 1911)
 Pareuplexia quadripuncta (Warren, 1911)
 Pareuplexia ruficosta (Warren, 1911)
 Pareuplexia rufistigma (Warren, 1911)

References
Natural History Museum Lepidoptera genus database
Pareuplexia at funet

Hadeninae